Pierre Amable Jean-Baptiste Trannoy (Amiens, Somme, 22 November 1772 – Amiens, 26 March 1831) was a French physician, hygienist and botanist.

Biography
Son of Jean-Baptiste Martin Trannoy and Marie-Catherine Julie Chopin he was first surgeon-major of a battalion of "réquisitionnaires" in his home town, then second surgeon at the Hôtel-Dieu d'Amiens on the Chaussée Saint-Leu.

In 1795, he went to Paris to attend medical courses at the Sorbonne.

In 1798, he was appointed curator and director of the Botanical Garden of Amiens and professor of natural history at the Central School of the Somme department a chair he held until this school was abolished in 1802.

In 1801, he submitted a medical thesis to the Faculty of Medicine in Paris, entitled: Sur le pronostic des affections sympathiques de l'œil dans les maladies aiguës (On the prognosis of sympathetic eye diseases in acute illnesses).

In 1807 and 1808, he was professor of anatomy, physiology, medical subjects and hygiene at the civil hospices in Amiens.

In 1815, he was appointed doctor of epidemics for the districts of Amiens and Dourlens (now Doullens).

In 1819, he wrote an Traité élémentaire des maladies épidémiques ou populaires à l'usage des officiers de santé (Elementary Treatise on Epidemic or Popular Diseases for the use of health officers).

Trannoy is the author of a dissertation in response to these questions posed by the "Académie des sciences, belles-lettres et arts de Rouen" (Academy of Sciences, belles-lettres and arts of Rouen) put out to tender in 1822:
 Is it proven that fevers by infection exist without being contagious? 
 What are the main causes that give rise to their development? 
 What are the appropriate means to prevent them or stop their progress?

Joseph-Marie Quérard also notes that:

Works 
 Catalogne de botanique, suivant le système de Linné
 Notice historique sur le jardin de botanique de l'école communale d'Amiens
 Tableau synoptique de l'organe des plantes
 Traité élémentaire des maladies épidémiques ou populaires (1819)
 Concordance de l'État atmosphérique avec les maladies régnantes à Amiens et dans ses environs (Concordance of the atmospheric state with the diseases prevailing in Amiens and its surroundings) from 1819 to 1826.

References

People from Amiens
Hygienists
19th-century physicians
1772 births
1831 deaths
19th-century French botanists
College of Sorbonne alumni